Khadija Yaken (Arabic: خديجة يكن) (born in 1972 in Casablanca, Morocco), is a Moroccan writer. Her works of prose and poetry in both the Arabic and Amazigh language, occupy official site affairs Amazigh literature in the Morocco Writers Union.

Early life and education 
She was born in Casablanca to a family of origin from Souss. She received her education at the schools of Ibn al-Banna al-Marrakchi, Uqba ibn Nafi, and her university education at Hassan II University.

Her literary career 
She began writing the story in the 1990s and in 1994 published her first text, "When Carmina Burana Flows", which won the 1998 ISESCO Prize for Fiction.  later published the novel "Bosnian Days", which won the Sudanese Altayeb Salih Prize for Written Creativity" in 2018.

She published three Amazigh collections, and their titles are as follows: Diwan Elodi (The Chrysanthemum), the first Amazigh women's publication in the Souss-Massa region, Diwan Togot Tagburt (the ancient scent), and Divan Oum Asif Izhevin (like a long river). Then the novel "Titrit n' Tiwdish" (The Sunset Star), She later went on to write in Amazigh and published in 2009 her first poetic work, "Elodi" (The Chrysanthemum), which is the first Amazigh women's publication in the Souss-Massa region. and 2010, and also the book "Umm Asif Izhevin" (such as a long river), and in 2011 the novel "Tatar n Teoosh" (The Sunset Star) was published.

She has also published separate stories in Arabic and Amazigh in different newspapers and websites, and has writings and positions dealing with the Amazigh identity issue and women's issues.

She recited her poems in various events, including the "World Poetry Day" organized by the Royal Institute of Amazigh Culture in Rabat in 2010, the Federation of Feminist Action in Kenitra, the Voice of Amazigh Women in Rabat, Timgarine in Casablanca.

Awards 

 1996 ISESCO Prize for the Best Story from the Islamic World, for the story "When Carmina Burana Flows"
 2010 Appreciation Award from the Royal Institute of Amazigh Culture
 2018 Al-Tayeb Al-Saleh International Prize for Written Creativity in Sudan for her short story collection “Bosnian Days”

References 

Moroccan writers
1972 births
Living people